Abdullah Omar Ismail (Arabic: عبد الله عمر; born 1 January 1987) is a Chadian-born Bahraini professional footballer currently playing for Al Ettifaq FC as a midfielder. He also plays for the Bahrain national football team.

International career

International goals
Scores and results list Bahrain's goal tally first.

References

External links

football.ch 

1987 births
Living people
Bahraini footballers
Neuchâtel Xamax FCS players
Swiss Super League players
2007 AFC Asian Cup players
2011 AFC Asian Cup players
2015 AFC Asian Cup players
People from N'Djamena
Al-Muharraq SC players
Ittihad FC players
Al Ahli SC (Doha) players
Association football midfielders
Footballers at the 2006 Asian Games
Ettifaq FC players
Saudi First Division League players
Saudi Professional League players
Qatar Stars League players
Qatari Second Division players
Bahraini expatriate footballers
Asian Games competitors for Bahrain
Bahraini expatriate sportspeople in Saudi Arabia
Expatriate footballers in Saudi Arabia
Bahrain international footballers